Chisago City is a city in Chisago County, Minnesota, United States, approximately 35 miles northeast of downtown Minneapolis–Saint Paul. The population was 4,967 at the 2010 census.

The city is between the twin lakes of Chisago Lake and Green Lake, and is part of the Chisago lakes region.

Geography

Infrastructure

Transportation
U.S. Highway 8 serves as a main route for the community.

History
Chisago City was founded by Swedish immigrants in the 1850s. The city took its name from Chisago Lake. It was originally settled one mile south, but when the railroad bypassed the town in 1880, the city moved closer to the railroad, as often happened during that time.

Demographics

2010 census
As of the census of 2010, there were 4,967 people, 2,051 households, and 1,306 families living in the city. The racial makeup of the city was 96.7% White, 0.6% African American, 0.5% Native American, 0.6% Asian, 0.1% Pacific Islander, 0.3% from other races, and 1.1% from two or more races. Hispanic or Latino of any race were 1.7% of the population.

There were 2,051 households, of which 29.8% had children under the age of 18 living with them, 51.9% were married couples living together, 7.5% had a female householder with no husband present, 4.3% had a male householder with no wife present, and 36.3% were non-families. 31.5% of all households were made up of individuals, and 18.9% had someone living alone who was 65 years of age or older. The average household size was 2.35 and the average family size was 2.93.

The median age in the city was 43.3 years. 22.7% of residents were under the age of 18; 6.4% were between the ages of 18 and 24; 22.9% were from 25 to 44; 27.9% were from 45 to 64; and 20.2% were 65 years of age or older. The gender makeup of the city was 48.4% male and 51.6% female.

2000 census
As of the census of 2000, there were 2,622 people, 1,038 households, and 685 families living in the city. The racial makeup of the city was 97.10% White, 0.53% African American, 0.19% Native American, 0.46% Asian, 0.08% Pacific Islander, 0.57% from other races, and 1.07% from two or more races. Hispanic or Latino of any race were 1.60% of the population.

There were 1,038 households, out of which 32.9% had children under the age of 18 living with them, 51.4% were married couples living together, 10.1% had a female householder with no husband present, and 34.0% were non-families. 29.2% of all households were made up of individuals, and 17.1% had someone living alone who was 65 years of age or older.  The average household size was 2.42 and the average family size was 2.96.

In the city, the population was spread out, with 25.1% under the age of 18, 8.0% from 18 to 24, 27.8% from 25 to 44, 18.1% from 45 to 64, and 21.0% who were 65 years of age or older.  The median age was 38 years. For every 100 females, there were 87.3 males.  For every 100 females age 18 and over, there were 81.3 males.

The median income for a household in the city was $38,352, and the median income for a family was $51,964. Males had a median income of $38,988 versus $27,163 for females. The per capita income for the city was $22,321.  About 3.8% of families and 6.0% of the population were below the poverty line, including 4.1% of those under age 18 and 8.0% of those age 65 or over.

Sister cities
  Algutsboda, Sweden

See also
 Chisago Lakes School District

References

External links 
 Chisago City Official Website
 Chisago City Heritage
 Chisago City, Minnesota at the Minnesota Historical Society.

Cities in Chisago County, Minnesota
Cities in Minnesota